Ozernoye is a rural locality (a selo) and the administrative center of Ozernovsky Selsoviet in Ikryaninsky District, Astrakhan Oblast, Russia. The population was 653 as of 2010. There are 2 streets.

Geography 
Ozernoye is located 21 km west of Ikryanoye (the district's administrative centre) by road. Gusinoye is the nearest rural locality.

References 

Rural localities in Ikryaninsky District